Arp 104, also known as Keenan's system, is entry 104 in Halton Arp's Atlas of Peculiar Galaxies catalog for spiral galaxy NGC 5216 and globular galaxy NGC 5218. The two galaxies are joined by a bridge of galactic material spanning 22 000 light years.

In 1790 William Herschel discovered the galaxies, and in 1926 they were studied by Edwin Hubble. In 1935 Philip C. Keenan first published a paper about the bridge connecting the galaxies, which was rediscovered in 1958 at the Lick and Palomar observatories.

References

External links

Astronomy Picture of the Day
Galaxies on a String - 2008 July 31
Galaxies on a String - 2010 July 2

104
Interacting galaxies
Ursa Major (constellation)
05216
08528